Araneus obtusatus is a species of spider of the genus Araneus. It is endemic to Sri Lanka.

See also 
 List of Araneidae species

References

External links
biolib.cz
Use of spider venoms for skin whitening/depigmenting and composition comprising spider venoms molecules or synthetic analogs

Araneidae
Spiders described in 1879
Spiders of Asia
Endemic fauna of Sri Lanka